, released in Europe as Dancing Stage SuperNova, is an arcade and PlayStation 2 game in the Dance Dance Revolution (DDR) series of music video games. It was produced by Konami and released through Betson Enterprises. The game was released in Europe on April 28, 2006, followed shortly by a North American release on May 15 and a Japanese release on July 12.

It is the first DDR game released for the arcades since Dance Dance Revolution Extreme three years before, although there had been steady releases of DDR games for consoles in the interim. Instead of Bemani System 573 Digital, the arcade version was built using the PlayStation 2-based Bemani Python 2, which results in higher-quality graphics and superior sounds than previous games. Unlike previous DDR arcade releases, all versions have the same features and song list. It is the ninth arcade release in Japan, the fifth arcade release in Europe, and the third arcade release in North America.

Gameplay
The game retains the same core gameplay of the series. During gameplay, arrows scroll from the bottom to the top of the screen towards stationary arrows known as the "Step Zone". Once they reach the zone, players step on the dance pad corresponding to the arrows and the game will then judge the accuracy of the timing. The rankings are as follow: "Marvelous", "Perfect", "Great", "Good", "Almost", and "Boo". The last two rankings are taken from the North American games and differ from the ones used for DDR Extreme, which respectively has "Boo" and "Miss".

There are also changes in modifiers. The game adds the option to turn off jumps. In addition to "Flat" (all arrows are the same color), and "Rainbow" (brightly colored arrows taken from Dance Dance Revolution Solo, previously named "Solo"), a "Note" arrow option is added, which recolors the arrows based on timing (e.g. red for 1/4 beat arrows, blue for 1/8 beat arrows, etc.). "Little", which removes all non-quarter beat arrows, has been renamed "Cut".

Aesthetic changes include the renaming of three difficulty options: "Light", "Standard", and "Heavy" to "Basic", "Difficult", and "Expert", respectively. The song selection screen is still displayed in the form of a song wheel, but all difficulties are now displayed at once, instead of having to be highlighted separately. Instead of pre-rendered videos, songs are set to randomly generated characters dancing in several backgrounds, though certain songs may replace them with pre-rendered videos instead.

Instead of a difficulty option shown after selecting play styles, the game presents a mode selection offering eight options: "Tutorial", "Easy", "Medium", "Difficult", "All Music", "Nonstop", "Challenge", and "Battle". Tutorial is a new addition: it teaches first-time players on the basics of the game, before offering them a chance to play a song out of a limited selection in Beginner difficulty. Easy, Medium, and Difficult modes take players to normal gameplay but restrict them to a limited selection of songs based on their difficulty. As the name indicates, the entire song list can only be accessed through the All Music mode. Nonstop and Challenge modes, retained from previous games, can also be accessed through the same mode selection. Finally, the game introduces "Battle" mode, a gimmick-based gameplay in which opposing players compete by sending modifiers to mess up each other's playthrough.

DDR SuperNova is the first in the series to support e-Amusement functionality. The service is used for Internet Ranking, updates, and content delivery. The service is not available outside of Asia. In addition, it was supposed to feature Link Data, designed to provide connectivity between the arcade and PS2 versions of the game, by means of a PS2 memory card. The reader was depicted in arcade flyers, but it was never released. This feature already existed in Dance Dance Revolution Extreme and several earlier releases, but used original PlayStation memory cards and readers instead, which SuperNova does not support. Supplier issues with Sony forced Konami to cancel the functionality. To compensate, Konami offered a coupon or soundtrack sampler for customers in North America who purchased the game in 2006.

Extra Stage
In the first SuperNova, the Extra Stage system introduced in DDRMAX returns. Scoring AA or better in the final stage on Expert or Challenge difficulty will net access to Extra Stage. A new boss song will be added, though players may choose any song for Extra Stage. Unlike in DDR Extreme, players are free to choose any difficulty, instead of being locked to Expert. What boss song they get depends on which game mode they selected; selecting Easy or Medium modes will add "Healing-D-Vision", while selecting Difficult or All Music modes will add "Fascination MAXX" and "Fascination (eternal love mix)". Regardless of which song they choose, they are forced to play it with several options turned on, including 1.5x speed, "Reverse" scroll (arrows come from top to bottom instead of the opposite), and "Rainbow" arrow option. The dance meter starts full and cannot be replenished if it goes down.

If players manage to pass "Healing-D-Vision" and "Fascination MAXX" in Extra Stage, they will gain access to One More Extra Stage. The only song available for selection is "CHAOS". During this stage, players are forced to play in Sudden Death dance meter, in which a single Good, Almost, Miss, or N.G. judgment will immediately end the game. All options are disabled.

SuperNova 2 overhauls the Extra Stage system: scoring A or better on any song prior to Final Stage will add a new boss song for that stage. Getting A will only unlock the boss song's difficulty corresponding to the one played on the required song, while getting AA or better will unlock all difficulties except for Challenge. Getting AA or better on the boss song will net players access to Extra Stage, which adds another boss song. Unlike previous games, players may change options for Extra Stage, though the dance meter will be limited to a non-renewable battery with up to 4 bars, the amount of which depends on the score attained during Final Stage. If they score AA or better on that boss song, the player will net access to Encore Extra Stage ("One More Extra Stage" in previous games). In yet another deviation, players may choose any song and set options, but their dance meter will still be set to "Sudden Death", in which scoring Good, Almost, Boo, or N.G. will end the game.

SuperNova 2 alters the Final, Extra and Encore Extra stages based on e-Amusement status in Asia, and unlock level status in North America. By default, "Unreal" is the Final Stage, "NGO" is the Extra Stage, and ""Trip Machine PhoeniX" is the Encore Extra Stage. It is possible to unlock "PARANOiA (HADES)", "Pluto", and "Pluto Relinquish" as Encore Extra Stages. Upon completing all unlock levels, all boss songs are available for regular play.

Release
Dancing Stage SuperNova was previewed at ATEI 2006 from January 24, 2006 to January 26, 2006. The arcade machine used for the preview has a build date of January 8, 2006, and featured 230 songs, including 46 new songs for the arcade series. Dancing Stage SuperNova was released to European arcades on April 28, 2006.

Dance Dance Revolution SuperNova was released on May 15, 2006 in North America, and on July 12, 2006 in Japan. The game premiered at the Tomorrowland Starcade at Disneyland in Anaheim, California. In addition to brand new machines, a small number of conversion kits were made available, allowing older cabinets to be upgraded to SuperNova. The SuperNova 2 conversion kit allowed new and upgraded SuperNova cabinets to run SuperNova 2.

The original SuperNova received an offline update on June 15, 2006 in North America and on July 15, 2006 in Europe, to fix timing issues and to offer two additional songs: "Fascination ~eternal love mix~" and "Flow (true style)". The Japanese release included this update at launch.

Sequel

Dance Dance Revolution SuperNova 2, sometimes abbreviated as DDR SN2, was released on August 22, 2007 by Konami to Japanese arcades and on February 21, 2008 for the PlayStation 2 counterpart. In North America, a slightly different PlayStation 2 version was released first on September 25, 2007 before that region's arcade release on January 17, 2008. It is the final arcade release to be powered by the PlayStation 2 by means of the Python 2 arcade board.

SuperNova 2 features some changes to the series. It introduces a new scoring system that is retained in all future installments. The score cap is 1,000,000 and factors in Marvelous timing, making it an integral part of the gameplay instead of being restricted to courses. A full combo is not a prerequisite for AA or AAA ratings, which are now determined solely by score.

The game adds several new options, including 0.25x and 0.5x speed, Brake (arrows slow down when they are about to reach the Step Zone) and Wave (arrows bounce up and down as they reach the Step Zone, similar to a wave). Aesthetic additions include unique arrow shapes, character cut-ins which happen if players reach certain combo milestones, and a small marquee which displays the song title and artist during gameplay. It is also one of the few arcade DDR games which provides everyone with a character select screen before the gameplay proper; later games would restrict this to e-Amusement players. The mode selection from SuperNova has been simplified to offering just six options; Easy, Medium, and Difficult modes are replaced with "Beginner", which provides a limited selection of the song list, while All Music is renamed "Standard".

While the first SuperNova introduced e-Amusement in a limited fashion, the service is taken to its full advantage in SuperNova 2, a practice that would be replicated in future games. E-Amusement players are given additional information and stats and could participate in limited-time events. The game has a vast amount of post-release content delivered through e-Amusement up to a year after release. Since the service continues to be unavailable outside of Asia, Konami compensated this by sending codes to arcade operators which can be entered to unlock in-game content.

Other
The soundtrack of the game ranges from classic Konami Originals to new pop and dance standards. The console version in North America features songs by Justin Timberlake, Gwen Stefani, Ian Van Dahl and Goldfrapp. Also featured is EyeToy support for additional gameplay elements as well as mini-games using the camera and online play through the PlayStation Network allowing players to face-off with other players across the country. The game was well received as a solid addition to the DDR lineup.

Music

The arcade release of SuperNova contains 304 songs, of which 120 are new to the arcade series. The new content includes 19 licensed songs, one time-limited license ("Beautiful Life"), 17 Konami originals, 29 Bemani crossovers, and 54 songs from previous console versions of Dance Dance Revolution. Two of the Konami originals, "Fascination ～eternal love mix～" and "Flow (True Style)", require the July 2006 arcade patch to be played.

The arcade release of SuperNova 2 contains 357 songs, of which 62 are new to the arcade series. The new content includes 15 licensed songs, 23 Konami originals, 9 Bemani crossovers, 9 songs from previous console versions of SuperNova, and 6 Challenge-only steps for older Dance Dance Revolution songs.

SuperNova and SuperNova 2 feature several songs based on anime themes:
 "Angelus -アンジェラス-" by Hitomi Shimatani is featured in Inuyasha as the opening theme for the final 14 episodes of season 6. This song is available in the arcade releases of Dance Dance Revolution SuperNova 2, X and X2. It is also available in the Japanese and North American releases of SuperNova 2 for the PlayStation 2.
 "Baby's Tears" by Miki Roberts, an alias for Riyu Kosaka, is an English song available in SuperNova for arcades and the PlayStation 2. A Japanese version, credited simply to Riyu Kosaka, was recorded as the opening theme for Sky Girls. It was included in the Japanese release of SuperNova for the PlayStation 2, and SuperNova 2 for arcade and non-Japanese PlayStation 2 releases. Both versions of the theme song are unavailable in subsequent arcade releases.
 "そばかす Freckles (KCP Re-Edit)" by Tiggy, an English eurodance cover of "Freckles" by Judy and Mary, was previously available in DDRMAX, DDRMAX2 and Dance Dance Revolution Extreme. It is absent in the arcade release of SuperNova, and in subsequent arcade releases, but it is available in the North American release of SuperNova for the PlayStation 2.
 "Trust -DanceDanceRevolution mix-" by Tatsh featuring Yoko is the theme song for Yoko from Gurren Lagann. It is available in Dance Dance Revolution SuperNova 2 for arcades and the Japanese PlayStation 2, and in Dance Dance Revolution X for arcades and the North American PlayStation 2. In contrast to other anime themes available in SuperNova and SuperNova 2, "Trust -DanceDanceRevolution mix-" returns in every subsequent arcade release.

Grand Cross
Grand Cross is a song series in Dance Dance Revolution SuperNova 2.

Reception

Arcade
The original Dance Dance Revolution SuperNova arcade release in North America reached sales of about 250 brand new cabinets by distributor Betson. The company also released a smaller run of brand new Dance Dance Revolution SuperNova 2 cabinets, and upgrade kits for both SuperNova games. A Polygon article published in 2017 noted that these brand new machines used "lower quality footpads and monitors" compared to Asia, though still of better quality than the infamous Dance Dance Revolution X and X2 arcade releases in North America and Europe.

In October 2018, there were 337 public SuperNova and SuperNova 2 arcade machines available worldwide, of which 253 were located in the Americas. As of August 2021, there are 301 public SuperNova and SuperNova 2 machines worldwide.

PlayStation 2

The PlayStation 2 release of SuperNova and SuperNova 2 received mixed reviews. For the first title, GameSpot and IGN each gave it a 7 out of 10 rating. Eurogamer gave Dancing Stage SuperNova a 6 out of 10.

Legacy
To celebrate the 20th anniversary of Dance Dance Revolution, Dance Dance Revolution A received a DDR Selection mode, featuring songs from older mixes. A dozen of songs from the DDR SuperNOVA series, with six per SuperNOVA game, can be played with the SuperNOVA 2 interface by using this mode. Dance Dance Revolution A20 also offers this mode.

In 2019, a love hotel in Kobe, Japan installed Dance Dance Revolution SuperNova in a hotel room.

Dance Dance Revolution A20 introduced a new cover of "Long Train Runnin'" by The Doobie Brothers as free downloadable content. The SuperNova series and DDR X feature a cover by X-Treme, whereas DDRMAX2 and DDR Extreme feature a cover by Bus Stop with different lyrics. The A20 cover incorporates lyrics from both the X-Treme and Bus Stop covers.

Gallery

References

External links
Dance Dance Revolution SuperNova gateway (Japan, America & Europe)
Dance Dance Revolution SuperNova Konami US product page

2006 video games
Arcade video games
Dance Dance Revolution games
EyeToy games
Multiplayer online games
PlayStation 2 games
Video games developed in Germany
Video games developed in Japan
Video games developed in the United States
Multiplayer and single-player video games